Lucille Méthé (born December 15, 1957 in Henryville, Quebec) was the Action démocratique du Québec Member of the National Assembly of Quebec, Canada, for the electoral district of Saint-Jean.

Background

Methe has a Bachelor's Degree in Business Administration from the Université du Québec à Montréal and also studied at the Séminaire de Sherbrooke in International Commerce in 2001.  She also worked as an advertisement publisher and originator, a promotion agent and a cooperative and export adviser.

Prior attempts

She was the ADQ candidate for Iberville in the 2003, but lost to Liberal candidate Jean Rioux. She also was the Action civique candidate for Mayor of Saint-Jean-sur-Richelieu in the 2005, but was defeated by Gilles Dolbec.

Méthé was first elected in 2007 with 42% of the vote. Liberal incumbent Jean-Pierre Paquin, finished third with 25% of the vote. On March 29, 2007, Méthé was appointed Deputy Official Opposition House Whip and the critic for government services.

Footnotes

External links
 

1957 births
Action démocratique du Québec MNAs
Living people
Women MNAs in Quebec
Université du Québec à Montréal alumni
21st-century Canadian politicians
21st-century Canadian women politicians